Hrušky is a municipality and village in Břeclav District in the South Moravian Region of the Czech Republic. It has about 1,600 inhabitants.

Geography
It lies in a flat agricultural landscape of the Lower Morava Valley. The Svodnice stream forms the eastern municipal border.

History
The first written mention of Hrušky dates from 1368.

The village was heavily damaged by the 2021 South Moravia tornado.

Notable people
Rudolph Krejci (1929–2018), Czech-American philosopher

Twin towns – sister cities

Hrušky is twinned with:
 Waldbredimus, Luxembourg

References

External links

Villages in Břeclav District
Moravian Slovakia